Swarnalatha Rangarajan is a Professor of English at the Department of Humanities and Social Sciences, IIT Madras.

Early life 

A course in advanced fiction writing that she took at Harvard University as a Fulbright scholar got her interested in fiction. 
Professor of English and Comparative Religions at the Department of Humanities in BITS Pilani.

Career 

Zubaan’s 21 under 40, Penguin’s First Proof, South Asian Review, New Asian Writing, India Currents and Asia Writes have published her short fiction. She is a recipient of the CWIT Fellowship (Charles Wallace India Trust, London) and has pursued research at the Centre for Research in the Arts, Humanities and Social Sciences(CRASSH) at Cambridge University.

Her first novel, "Final Instructions", published by Authorspress  has an ecosophical theme.

Personal life 

She is passionate about "Environmental Humanities" and is the founding editor of the academic journal, "The Indian Journal of Ecocriticism".

Novels 
Final Instructions

External links 
 Dr Swarnalatha Rangarajan's interview for New Indian Express
 Book launch of "Final Instructions"
 CRASSH
 New Asian Writing

English writers
Year of birth missing (living people)
Living people